Ponnu Pakka Poren is a 1989 Indian Tamil-language romantic drama film directed by N. Murugesh. The film stars Prabhu and Seetha. It was released on 22 December 1989.

Plot 
Madhangopal is a government official designated to serve a village for a period of time, until he is transferred again.  He arrives in a village terrorised by leopards and was caught unawares by one and barely escapes when the village chieftain's daughter Kasthuri rescues him. The two afterwards regularly meet, playing pranks on each other and eventually fall in love. Vembu is another recent arrival in the village, who knows Kasthuri and her family from his original village, where Kasthuri and his dear sister Devaki were classmates as young girls.  Devaki aspires to be a doctor, to Vembhu's pride.  Vembu is interested in Kasthuri, but he does not openly say so, nor does she reciprocate his feelings and they remain platonic. One day Vembu comes back to Kasthuri's village after visiting his village, announcing that his beloved sister Devaki had died.  Vembhu becomes an alcoholic burning with anger and pain. Kasthuri shows sympathy and kindness and tells Vembu she regards him like a brother; Vembu then also treats Kasthuri as his sister and promises to give up drinking. He also saves Kasthuri twice from a village thug who attempts to molest her, and promises he will ensure Madhanagopal and Kasthuri get married.  Meanwhile, Kasthuri's mother gets a shocking revelation from the astrologer that due to karma, Kasthuri's first marriage will not last and only her second marriage will.  Upset at the prospect of her daughter becoming widowed, Kasthuri's mother asks the village Iyer to perform penitential oblations to the Gods, to help nullify Kasthuri's karma and save her future husband-but-the astrologer is cynical that  fate can be altered.

Unknown to Kasthuri, Madhanagopal is not who he seems to be and has a dark past and a sinister agenda. He is a heartless playboy who had falsely promised marriage to women in other villages and thereby tricks them into having sex with him, and promptly ditches them, once he transfers to another village for his job. Madhanagopal receives transfer orders and bemoans that he has to leave and yet been unable to trick Kasthuri into sleeping with him despite repeated attempts, as Kasthuri will do so before marriage.  He concocts a dastardly plan, giving Vembu a love letter for Kasthuri asking her to meet him alone at the village temple that night.  When Vembu reads the letter, he is shaken to the core, after recognising an image Madhanagopal drew on it. It appears one of Madhanagopal's past victims was Vembu' sister Devaki who committed suicide after becoming pregnant and ditched by MadhanaGopal. Vembu rushes to his village, compares Madhanagopal's letter to Kasthuri and his past letter to Devaki and recognises identical writing styles and the same image.  He is livid and rushes back to Kasthuri's village to warn her, but is delayed when his motorcycle stalls on the road.

Meanwhile, Madhanagopal succeeds in his plan, he pressures Kasthuri to marry him in secret at night at the village temple, without any witnesses and by tying the thaali around her neck and sleeps with her as her husband. He then tells Kasthuri to walk ahead, planning to slip away and catch the midnight train to his new village job and ditch Kasthuri in the process. Unfortunately for him, he is bitten by an Indian cobra before he could slip away and screams in pain. Kasthuri saves him by tying her thaali above his wound and stems the venom, allowing Madhanagopal time to get treated.  Once he recovers the next day, Madhanagopal turns over a new leaf and revisits the village temple and pours out his regret, promises the deity he will remarry Kasthuri  a second time with the same thaali, this time with pure intentions and beg her forgiveness for his past evil intent.

On his way to meet Kasthuri, he runs into Vembu, who with a smile persuades Madhanagopal to allow Vembu to ferry him across the village river to where the leopards usually roam.  Once on the other bank, Vembu thrashes Madhanagopal and tells him he knows about his cruel deeds, what he did to his sister Devaki and vows he will not allow him to do the same to Kasthuri or any other woman. Vembu ties Madhanagopal to a tree, to be eaten alive by leopards, as a punishment, despite his desperate pleas for forgiveness and promises of having reformed and true intent to make Kasthuri his wife.

Kasthuri arrives on the scene and overhears everything.  She tells Vembu it is too late, as she has already married him the night before and lost her chastity; she acknowledges that Madhanagopal deserves his fate, but insists on joining him in death and being eaten alive by the oncoming leopard. Vembu is forced therefore to fight the leopard, in order to save Kasthuri and he succeeds in killing it.  Vembu then forgives Madhanagopal, asks him to retie the thaali on Kasthuri's neck and blesses their union.  Vembu walks away in peace, leaving the reformed Madhanagopal to begin a new life with his bride Kasthuri. Kasthuri's astrological prediction therefore comes true that her first marriage will not last; only her second one will!

Cast 
 Prabhu
 Seetha
 Sivaji Manohar
 Janagaraj

Production
Manohar, son of Sivaji Ganesan's elder brother Shanmugam made his acting debut with this film.

Soundtrack 
The soundtrack was composed by Bhagyaraj.

References

External links 
 

1980s Tamil-language films
1989 films
1989 romantic drama films
Films scored by K. Bhagyaraj
Indian romantic drama films